Yvon Quédec (born 8 January 1939) is a French former footballer. He competed in the men's tournament at the 1960 Summer Olympics.

References

External links
 

1939 births
Living people
French footballers
Olympic footballers of France
Footballers at the 1960 Summer Olympics
Sportspeople from Boulogne-Billancourt
Association football midfielders
Footballers from Hauts-de-Seine